Sun was a British comic magazine focusing on adventure strips, published from 1947 to 1959. Sun featured such strips as Battler Britton, Billy the Kid, and Max Bravo; contributors included Mike Butterworth, D. C. Eyles, Geoff Campion, Don Lawrence, Eric Parker, Reg Bunn, and Gianluigi Coppola. Sun published 558 issues before merging with the Fleetway Publications title Lion.

Publication history 
Sun was launched by Cheshire-based publisher J. B. Allen in November 1947, sporting a mixture of adventure and humour strips. In May 1949, J. B. Allen — including their comics titles Sun and The Comet — was acquired by Amalgamated Press (AP), with AP continuing the titles essentially under the same names.

With AP's takeover, Leonard Matthews was appointed editor of Sun, increasing the publication's adventure content. Matthews hired Geoff Campion to draw Billy the Kid, and introduced new characters like Max Bravo and Battler Britton. Battler Britton first appeared in Sun #362 (January 14, 1956), becoming the cover feature with issue #490 (June 28, 1958) — in fact, from April to September 1959, Sun carried the tagline "Battler Britton's Own Weekly."

In 1959, Amalgamated Press was bought by the Mirror Group and renamed Fleetway Publications (after the name of AP's headquarters, Fleetway House). With the transition to Fleetway, in October 1959 the AP titles The Comet, Sun, and Tiny Tots were all merged into other AP titles; Sun merged with Lion. The merged title was called Lion and Sun for about six months before reverting simply to Lion.

Strips 
 The Adventures of Boy Colin
 Barry Ford's Western Scrapbook
 Battler Britton by Mike Butterworth and Geoff Campion
 Billy the Kid by Don Lawrence, Geoff Campion, and later Gianluigi Coppola
 Clip McCord by Reg Bunn
 Handy Andy
 Highway Days
 Ivanhoe (28 June 1952 – 15 November 1952) by Patrick Nicolle
 Jak of the Jaguars
 Lord of Sherwood
 Max Bravo, the Happy Hussar by Mike Butterworth and Eric Parker
 Moko the Mischievous Monk
 My Pal Wagger
 Ollie the Merry Mouser
 The Penguin Patrol
 Simon the Simple Sleuth
 Sinbad Sails Again
 Sun Car Spotters Club
 Swiss Family Robinson
 Tommy's Magic Whistle

References

Further reading 
 Clark, Alan. Dictionary of British Comic Artists, Writers and Editors (The British Library, 1998).

External links 
 
 
 

Comics magazines published in the United Kingdom
1946 comics debuts
1959 comics endings
Magazines established in 1946
Magazines disestablished in 1959
Defunct British comics